United States v. Virginia, 518 U.S. 515 (1996), is a landmark case in which the Supreme Court of the United States struck down the long-standing male-only admission policy of the Virginia Military Institute (VMI) in a 7–1 decision. Justice Clarence Thomas, whose son was enrolled at the university at the time, recused himself.

Majority decision 
Writing for the majority, Justice Ruth Bader Ginsburg found that VMI had failed to show "exceedingly persuasive justification" for its sex-based admissions policy, violating the Fourteenth Amendment's Equal Protection Clause. In an attempt to satisfy equal protection requirements, the state of Virginia had proposed a parallel program for women, called the Virginia Women's Institute for Leadership (VWIL), located at Mary Baldwin College, a private liberal arts women's college.

Justice Ginsburg found, however, that the VWIL would not provide women with the same type of rigorous military training, facilities, courses, faculty, financial opportunities, and alumni reputation and connections that VMI affords male cadets, a decision evocative of Sweatt v. Painter (1950), in which the Court ruled that segregated law schools in Texas were unconstitutional, since a newly formed black law school clearly did not provide the same benefits to its students as the state's prestigious and long-maintained white law school. In her opinion, she stated: "The VWIL program is a pale shadow of VMI in terms of the range of curricular choices and faculty stature, funding, prestige, alumni support and influence."

Rehnquist concurrence 
Chief Justice William Rehnquist wrote a concurrence agreeing to strike down the male-only admissions policy of the Virginia Military Institute, as violative of the Fourteenth Amendment's Equal Protection Clause. However, he declined to join the majority opinion's basis for using the Fourteenth Amendment, writing: "Had Virginia made a genuine effort to devote comparable public resources to a facility for women, and followed through on such a plan, it might well have avoided an equal protection violation." This rationale supported separate but equal facilities separated on the basis of sex: "[I]t is not the 'exclusion of women' that violates the Equal Protection Clause, but the maintenance of an all-men school without providing any—much less a comparable—institution for women ... It would be a sufficient remedy, I think, if the two institutions offered the same quality of education and were of the same overall caliber."

Scalia dissent
Justice Scalia's lone dissent argued that the standard applied by the majority was closer to a strict scrutiny standard than the intermediate scrutiny standard applied to previous cases involving equal protection based on sex. Notably, however, the opinion for the Court eschewed either standard; its language did not comport with the "important governmental interest" formula used in prior intermediate scrutiny cases. Scalia argued: "[I]f the question of the applicable standard of review for sex-based classifications were to be regarded as an appropriate subject for reconsideration, the stronger argument would be not for elevating the standard to strict scrutiny, but for reducing it to rational-basis review."

Scalia made sure to provide Ginsburg with a copy of his dissent as quickly as he could, in order for her to better respond to it in her majority opinion. Ginsburg later recalled that Scalia "absolutely ruined my weekend, but my opinion is ever so much better because of his stinging dissent".

Aftermath
As the senior justice, Sandra Day O'Connor could have written the opinion, but in an act of generosity, demurred, saying, "This should be Ruth's." With the VMI decision, the high court effectively struck down any law which, as Justice Ginsburg wrote, "denies to women, simply because they are women, full citizenship stature — equal opportunity to aspire, achieve, participate in and contribute to society." Nina Tonenberg, journalist and legal affairs correspondent for National Public Radio, hailed Ginsburg's majority opinion as "the jewel in the crown of Ginsburg majority opinions". Professor of law at the University of Texas School of Law Steve Vladeck was highly positive of the Ginsburg decision: "The majority opinion in the VMI case is perhaps the best-known and most important majority opinion Justice Ginsburg has penned in her 24 years on the Supreme Court. That case, more than any other, epitomized the justices’ effort to establish true sex equality as a fundamental constitutional norm, and its effects are continuing to reverberate today."

Following the ruling, VMI contemplated going private to exempt itself from the 14th Amendment, and thus this ruling. The Department of Defense warned the school that it would withdraw all ROTC programs from the school if this privatization took place. As a result of the DOD action, Congress amended , to prohibit the military from withdrawing or diminishing any ROTC program at one of the six senior military colleges, including VMI.  However, VMI's Board of Visitors had already voted 9–8 to admit women and did not revisit the issue after the law was amended.

VMI was the last all-male public university in the United States. Justice Ginsburg told cadets of the Virginia Military Institute in 2018 that she knew her opinion “would make VMI a better place”. She also thought that those who were initially opposed would learn from their women classmates “how much good women could do for the institution.”

See also
 Mississippi University for Women v. Hogan
 List of United States Supreme Court cases, volume 518
 List of United States Supreme Court cases
 Lists of United States Supreme Court cases by volume

References

Further reading
 
 
 
 Stockel, Eric J. (1996). "Note, United States v. Virginia: Does Intermediate Scrutiny Still Exist?" 13 TOURO L. REV. 229 (1996)

External links

United States equal protection case law
United States Supreme Court cases
United States Supreme Court cases of the Rehnquist Court
Virginia Military Institute
Women in the United States military
1996 in United States case law
20th-century American trials
Legal history of Virginia
1996 in Virginia
United States gender discrimination case law
History of women in Virginia